The C&C 36-1 is a Canadian sailboat that was designed by C&C Design and first built in 1977.

Production
The boat was built by C&C Yachts in Canada, starting in 1977, but it is now out of production.

Design
The C&C 36-1 is a small recreational keelboat, built predominantly of fiberglass, with wood trim. It has a masthead sloop rig, an internally-mounted spade-type rudder and a fixed fin keel. The fixed fin keel version displaces  and carries  of lead ballast. The centerboard version displaces  and carries  of lead ballast.

A stub keel and centerboard was optional.

The boat is fitted with a Japanese Yanmar 3QM30 diesel engine.

The fix keel version has a PHRF racing average handicap of 132 with a high of 144 and low of 126. The centreboard version has a PHRF racing average handicap of 138 with a high of 144 and low of 135.

See also
List of sailing boat types

Similar sailboats
Bayfield 36
Beneteau 361
C&C 110
Catalina 36
Columbia 36
Coronado 35
CS 36
Ericson 36
Frigate 36
Hinterhoeller F3
Hunter 36
Hunter 36-2
Hunter 36 Legend
Hunter 36 Vision
Invader 36
Islander 36
Nonsuch 36
Portman 36
S2 11.0
Seidelmann 37
Vancouver 36 (Harris)
Watkins 36
Watkins 36C

References

Keelboats
1970s sailboat type designs
Sailing yachts
Sailboat type designs by C&C Design
Sailboat types built by C&C Yachts